Terre-de-Bas Island (officially in French: Terre-de-Bas des Saintes (literally: Lowland of les Saintes)) is an island in the Îles des Saintes archipelago, in the Lesser Antilles.

It belongs to the commune (municipality) of Terre-de-Bas in the French department of Guadeloupe.

Geography

Description
Terre-de-Bas island is the most occidental island of the archipelago of les Saintes. Like its neighbour Terre-de-Haut, it derives its name from maritime speak which called the islands exposed to the wind hightland and those protected from the wind, lowlands. It is an island of  dominated by a mountain massif sheltering a protected forest in its center (Morne à Coq hill, Morne Paquette hill, Morne Madis hill, Morne Abymes hill) and a coast lined with cliffs and points (in French: Pointe) (Pointe à Nègre point, Gros cap cliff, Pointe à Vache point, Pointe Noire point, Pointe Sud point). Besides Terre-de-Haut, several small islands surround Terre-de-Bas :
Îlet à Cabrit
la Redonde
Grand-Îlet
la Coche
les Augustins
le Pâté

Populated areas
Few villages are seen spread out in the rolling hills in the interior. Petite-Anse, the most important village of the island is located in a Valley encircled of mountain without views on the sea. Petite-Anse is the village where is the administrative buildings of the municipality (City hall, Post office, schools), on the opposite site of the principal harbour. The oldest settlement still remaining are the villages of Grande-Anse and Petite-Anse.The population is spread among 5 quartiers (district), more or less well delimited. They are grouped into two halves:

Demography
Contrary to Terre-de-Haut, Terre-de-Bas island has a population composed of mixed peoples because of its historical short time of agricultural crop. The (Saintois)  (French gentilic of the inhabitants of les Saintes) from Terre-de-Bas were 1,046 inhabitants in 2017, with a density of population of 154 inhabitants / km2. The number of households was 429 in 2017.

The life expectancy is 75 years for men and 82 years for women. The average number of children per woman is 2.32.

Climate

Language

History

Culture

Economy

The island lives essentially on fishing and craft industry. Contrary to Terre-de-Haut, Terre-de-Bas is unfrequented, however, tourism activities try to make a shy development since these three last years. A small West Indian bay tree (Pimenta racemosa) farm is more active and produce Bay rum" (a rub lotion which curatives qualities whose the efficiency was widely proved in the Antilles), for the regional markel.

Environment

Transport

Sights
Artillery battery ruins of Fer à Cheval (literally:horseshoe).
Walk into forest and pond
Mountain of Morne Paquette and Morne Abymes
Natural reserves protected by Conservatoire du littoral (Pointe Sud, Gros Cap, Pointe de Miquelon)
Saint-Nicholas' church
Anchorage and ruins of the old pottery factory
Diving sites (Sec pâté, Les Augustins)
The  beaches (Grande-Anse, Anse à Dos)
The Salako manufacturer

References

Islands of Guadeloupe
Inhabited islands of Îles des Saintes